A seaweed cultivator is a device which grows seaweed, usually in weekly or bi-weekly cycles. It is not to be confused with people who are seaweed cultivators themselves, usually performing manual cultivation of seaweed using large nets in open waters (mainly in Asian countries).

Seaweed cultivators (the devices) are just now becoming available to the public, mainly because of the LED (light-emitting diode) which has made low-cost, reliable, and waterproof illumination sources (especially in the red 660-nanometer spectrum) feasible. Seaweed cultivators are an offshoot of algae scrubbers, which were developed to filter aquariums. By replacing the aquarium with a reservoir of fertilized seawater, a stand-alone cultivator becomes possible, and even a desktop cultivator is possible if the size is small enough or if the reservoir is placed beneath the desk.

The type of seaweed that can be grown in a seaweed cultivator is currently limited to green types, mostly Angel Hair and sea lettuce, because other types such as Nori require more complex control of the water temperature and other variables. Angel Hair and sea lettuce, however, can be grown at home at room temperature.

Algaculture
Seaweeds